John Rogers Searle (born July 31, 1932) is an American philosopher widely noted for contributions to the philosophy of language, philosophy of mind, and social philosophy. He began teaching at UC Berkeley in 1959, and was Willis S. and Marion Slusser Professor Emeritus of the Philosophy of Mind and Language and Professor of the Graduate School at the University of California, Berkeley until 2019.

As an undergraduate at the University of Wisconsin–Madison, Searle was secretary of "Students against Joseph McCarthy". He received all his university degrees, BA, MA, and DPhil, from the University of Oxford, where he held his first faculty positions. Later, at UC Berkeley, he became the first tenured professor to join the 1964–1965 Free Speech Movement. In the late 1980s, Searle challenged the restrictions of Berkeley's 1980 rent stabilization ordinance. Following what came to be known as the California Supreme Court's "Searle Decision" of 1990, Berkeley changed its rent control policy, leading to large rent increases between 1991 and 1994.

In 2000, Searle received the Jean Nicod Prize; in 2004, the National Humanities Medal; and in 2006, the Mind & Brain Prize. He was elected to the American Philosophical Society in 2010. Searle's early work on speech acts, influenced by J.L. Austin and Ludwig Wittgenstein, helped establish his reputation. His notable concepts include the "Chinese room" argument against "strong" artificial intelligence.

In June 2019, Searle's status as professor emeritus at the University of California, Berkeley, was revoked because he was found to have violated the university's sexual harassment policies.

Biography

Searle's father, G.W. Searle, an electrical engineer, was employed by AT&T Corporation; his mother, Hester Beck Searle, was a physician.

Searle began his college education at the University of Wisconsin–Madison and in his junior year became a Rhodes Scholar at the University of Oxford, where he obtained all his university degrees, BA, MA, and DPhil.

Searle was the Willis S. and Marion Slusser Professor Emeritus of the Philosophy of Mind and Language and Professor of the Graduate School at the University of California, Berkeley, he had retired in 2014 but continued teaching until 2016. In June 2019, the emeritus title was revoked.

Politics
While an undergraduate at the University of Wisconsin–Madison, Searle became the secretary of "Students against Joseph McCarthy". McCarthy at that time served as the junior senator from Wisconsin. In 1959, Searle began teaching at Berkeley, and he was the first tenured professor to join the 1964–65 Free Speech Movement. In 1969, while serving as chairman of the Academic Freedom Committee of the Academic Senate of the University of California, he supported the university in its dispute with students over the People's Park.

In The Campus War: A Sympathetic Look at the University in Agony (1971), Searle investigates the causes behind the campus protests of the era. In it he declares, "I have been attacked by both the House Un-American Activities Committee and...several radical polemicists... Stylistically, the attacks are interestingly similar. Both rely heavily on insinuation and innuendo, and both display a hatred --one might almost say terror-- of close analysis and dissection of argument." He asserts that "My wife was threatened that I (and other members of the administration) would be assassinated or violently attacked."

In the late 1980s, Searle, along with other landlords, petitioned Berkeley's rental board to raise the limits on how much he could charge tenants under the city's 1980 rent-stabilization ordinance. The rental board refused to consider Searle's petition and Searle filed suit, charging a violation of due process. In 1990, in what came to be known as the "Searle Decision", the California Supreme Court upheld Searle's argument in part and Berkeley changed its rent-control policy, leading to large rent-increases between 1991 and 1994. Searle was reported to see the issue as one of fundamental rights, being quoted as saying "The treatment of landlords in Berkeley is comparable to the treatment of blacks in the South... our rights have been massively violated and we are here to correct that injustice." The court described the debate as a "morass of political invective, ad hominem attack, and policy argument".

Shortly after the September 11 attacks, Searle wrote an article arguing that the attacks were a particular event in a long-term struggle against forces that are intractably opposed to the United States, and signaled support for a more aggressive neoconservative interventionist foreign policy. He called for the realization that the United States is in a more-or-less permanent state of war with these forces. Moreover, a probable course of action would be to deny terrorists the use of foreign territory from which to stage their attacks. Finally, he alluded to the long-term nature of the conflict and blamed the attacks on the lack of American resolve to deal forcefully with America's enemies over the past several decades.

Sexual assault allegations

In March 2017, Searle became the subject of sexual assault allegations. The Los Angeles Times reported: "A new lawsuit alleges that university officials failed to properly respond to complaints that John Searle ... sexually assaulted his ... research associate last July and cut her pay when she rejected his advances." The case brought to light several earlier complaints against Searle, on which Berkeley allegedly had failed to act.

The lawsuit, filed in a California court on March 21, 2017, alleged sexual harassment, retaliation, wrongful termination and assault and battery and sought damages both from Searle and from the Regents of the University of California as his employers. It also claims that Jennifer Hudin, the director of the John Searle Center for Social Ontology, where the complainant had been employed as an assistant to Searle, has stated that Searle "has had sexual relationships with his students and others in the past in exchange for academic, monetary or other benefits". After news of the lawsuit became public, several previous allegations of sexual harassment by Searle were also revealed.

On June 19, 2019, following campus disciplinary proceedings by Berkeley's Office for the Prevention of Harassment and Discrimination (OPHD), University of California President Janet Napolitano approved a recommendation that Searle have his emeritus status revoked, after a determination that he had violated university policies against sexual harassment and retaliation between July and September 2016.

Awards and recognitions
Searle has five honorary-doctorate degrees from four countries and is an honorary visiting professor at Tsing Hua University and at East China Normal University.

In 2000, Searle received the Jean Nicod Prize; in 2004, the National Humanities Medal; and in 2006, the Mind & Brain Prize.

Philosophical work

Speech acts
Searle's early work, which did much to establish his reputation, was on speech acts. He attempted to synthesize ideas from many colleagues – including J.L. Austin (the "illocutionary act", from How To Do Things with Words), Ludwig Wittgenstein and G.C.J. Midgley (the distinction between regulative and constitutive rules) – with his own thesis that such acts are constituted by the rules of language. He also drew on the work of Paul Grice (the analysis of meaning as an attempt at being understood), Hare and Stenius (the distinction, concerning meaning, between illocutionary force and propositional content), P.F. Strawson, John Rawls and William Alston, who maintained that sentence meaning consists in sets of regulative rules requiring the speaker to perform the illocutionary act indicated by the sentence and that such acts involve the utterance of a sentence which (a) indicates that one performs the act; (b) means what one says; and (c) addresses an audience in the vicinity.

In his 1969 book Speech Acts, Searle sets out to combine all these elements to give his account of illocutionary acts. There he provides an analysis of what he considers the prototypical illocutionary act of promising and offers sets of semantical rules intended to represent the linguistic meaning of devices indicating further illocutionary act types. Among concepts presented in the book is the distinction between the "illocutionary force" and the "propositional content" of an utterance. Searle does not precisely define the former as such, but rather introduces several possible illocutionary forces by example. According to Searle, the sentences...
 Sam smokes habitually.
 Does Sam smoke habitually?
 Sam, smoke habitually!
 Would that Sam smoked habitually!

... each indicate the same propositional content (Sam smoking habitually) but differ in the illocutionary force indicated (respectively, a statement, a question, a command and an expression of desire).

According to a later account, which Searle presents in Intentionality (1983) and which differs in important ways from the one suggested in Speech Acts, illocutionary acts are characterised by having "conditions of satisfaction", an idea adopted from Strawson's 1971 paper "Meaning and Truth", and a "direction of fit", an idea adopted from Austin and Elizabeth Anscombe. For example, the statement "John bought two candy bars" is satisfied if and only if it is true, i.e., John did buy two candy bars. By contrast, the command "John, buy two candy bars!" is satisfied if and only if John carries out the action of purchasing two candy bars. Searle refers to the first as having the "word-to-world" direction of fit, since the words are supposed to change to accurately represent the world, and the second as having the "world-to-word" direction of fit, since the world is supposed to change to match the words. There is also the double direction of fit, in which the relationship goes both ways, and the null or zero direction of fit, in which it goes neither way because the propositional content is presupposed, as in "I am sorry I ate John's candy bars."

In Foundations of Illocutionary Logic (1985, with Daniel Vanderveken), Searle prominently uses the notion of the "illocutionary point".

Searle's speech-act theory has been challenged by several thinkers in various ways. Collections of articles referring to Searle's account are found in Burkhardt 1990 and Lepore / van Gulick 1991.

Intentionality and the background
In Intentionality: An Essay in the Philosophy of Mind (1983), Searle applies the principles of his account(s) of illocutionary acts to the investigation of intentionality, which is central to Searle's "Philosophy of Mind". (Searle is at pains to emphasize that 'intentionality', the capacity of mental states to be about worldly objects, is not to be confused with 'intensionality', the referential opacity of contexts that fail tests for 'extensionality'.)

For Searle, intentionality is exclusively mental, being the power of minds to represent or symbolize over, things, properties and states of affairs in the external world. Causal covariance, about-ness and the like are not enough: maps, for instance, only have a 'derived' intentionality, a mere after-image of the real thing.

Searle also introduces a technical term the Background, which, according to him, has been the source of much philosophical discussion ("though I have been arguing for this thesis for almost twenty years," Searle writes, "many people whose opinions I respect still disagree with me about it"). He calls Background the set of abilities, capacities, tendencies, and dispositions that humans have that are not themselves intentional states but that generate appropriate such states on demand.

Thus, when someone is asked to "cut the cake," they know to use a knife and when someone is asked to "cut the grass," they know to use a lawnmower (and not vice versa), even though the request did not mention this. Beginning with the possibility of reversing these two, an endless series of sceptical, anti-real or science-fiction interpretations could be imagined. "I wish to say that there is a radical underdetermination of what is said by the literal meaning..." emphasizes Searle. The Background fills the gap, being the capacity always to have a suitable interpretation to hand. "I just take a huge metaphysics for granted," he says. Searle sometimes supplements his reference to the Background with the concept of the Network, one's network of other beliefs, desires, and other intentional states necessary for any particular intentional state to make sense.

To give an example, two chess players might be engaged in a bitter struggle at the board, but they share all sorts of Background presuppositions: that they will take turns to move, that no one else will intervene, that they are both playing to the same rules, that the fire alarm will not go off, that the board will not suddenly disintegrate, that their opponent will not magically turn into a grapefruit, and so on indefinitely. As most of these possibilities will not have occurred to either player, Searle thinks the Background is itself unconscious as well as nonintentional. To have a Background is to have a set of brain structures that generate appropriate intentional states (if the fire alarm does go off, say). "Those brain structures enable me to activate the system of intentionality and to make it function, but the capacities realized in the brain structures do not themselves consist in intentional states."

It seems to Searle that Hume and Nietzsche were probably the first philosophers to appreciate, respectively, the centrality and radical contingency of the Background. "Nietzsche saw, with anxiety, that the Background does not have to be the way it is." Searle also thinks that a Background appears in the ideas of other modern thinkers: as the river-bed/substratum of Wittgenstein's On Certainty ("the work of the later Wittgenstein is in large part about the Background, especially On Certainty") and Pierre Bourdieu's habitus.

In his debate with Jacques Derrida, Searle argued against Derrida's purported view that a statement can be disjoined from the original intentionality of its author, for example when no longer connected to the original author, while still being able to produce meaning. Searle maintained that even if one was to see a written statement with no knowledge of authorship it would still be impossible to escape the question of intentionality, because "a meaningful sentence is just a standing possibility of the (intentional) speech act". For Searle, ascribing intentionality to a statement was a basic requirement for attributing it any meaning at all.

In 2023 Pierre Jacob described Searle's view as "anti-intentionalist".

Consciousness
Building upon his views about intentionality, Searle presents a view concerning consciousness in his book The Rediscovery of the Mind (1992). He argues that, starting with behaviorism, an early but influential scientific view, succeeded by many later accounts that Searle also dismisses, much of modern philosophy has tried to deny the existence of consciousness, with little success. In Intentionality, he parodies several alternative theories of consciousness by replacing their accounts of intentionality with comparable accounts of the hand:

No one would think of saying, for example, "Having a hand is just being disposed to certain sorts of behavior such as grasping" (manual behaviorism), or "Hands can be defined entirely in terms of their causes and effects" (manual functionalism), or "For a system to have a hand is just for it to be in a certain computer state with the right sorts of inputs and outputs" (manual Turing machine functionalism), or "Saying that a system has hands is just adopting a certain stance toward it" (the manual stance) (p. 263).

Searle argues that philosophy has been trapped by a false dichotomy: that, on one hand, the world consists of nothing but objective particles in fields of force, but that yet, on the other hand, consciousness is clearly a subjective first-person experience.

Searle says simply that both are true: consciousness is a real subjective experience, caused by the physical processes of the brain. (A view which he suggests might be called biological naturalism.)

Ontological subjectivity
Searle has argued that critics like Daniel Dennett, who he claims insist that discussing subjectivity is unscientific because science presupposes objectivity, are making a category error. Perhaps the goal of science is to establish and validate statements which are epistemically objective, i.e., whose truth can be discovered and evaluated by any interested party, but are not necessarily ontologically objective.

Searle calls any value judgment epistemically subjective. Thus, "McKinley is prettier than Everest" is "epistemically subjective", whereas "McKinley is higher than Everest" is "epistemically objective". In other words, the latter statement is evaluable, in fact, falsifiable, by an understood ('background') criterion for mountain height, like "the summit is so many meters above sea level". No such criteria exist for prettiness.

Beyond this distinction, Searle thinks there are certain phenomena, including all conscious experiences, that are ontologically subjective, i.e., can only exist as subjective experience. For example, although it might be subjective or objective in the epistemic sense, a doctor's note that a patient suffers from back pain is an ontologically objective claim: it counts as a medical diagnosis only because the existence of back pain is "an objective fact of medical science". The pain itself, however, is ontologically subjective: it is only experienced by the person having it.

Searle goes on to affirm that "where consciousness is concerned, the existence of the appearance is the reality". His view that the epistemic and ontological senses of objective/subjective are cleanly separable is crucial to his self-proclaimed biological naturalism, because it allows epistemically objective judgments like "That object is a pocket calculator" to pick out agent-relative features of objects, and such features are, on his terms, ontologically subjective, unlike, say, "That object is made mostly of plastic".

Artificial intelligence

A consequence of biological naturalism is that if humans want to create a conscious being, they will have to duplicate whatever physical processes the brain goes through to cause consciousness. Searle thereby means to contradict what he calls "Strong AI", defined by the assumption that as soon as a certain kind of software is running on a computer, a conscious being is thereby created.

In 1980, Searle presented the "Chinese room" argument, which purports to prove the falsity of strong AI. A person is in a room with two slits, and they have a book and some scratch paper. This person does not know any Chinese. Someone outside the room slides some Chinese characters in through the first slit; the person in the room follows the instructions in the book, transcribing the characters as instructed onto the scratch paper, and slides the resulting sheet out by the second slit. To people outside the room, it appears that the room speaks Chinese – they have slid Chinese statements into one slit and got valid responses in English – yet the 'room' does not understand a word of Chinese. This suggests, according to Searle, that no computer can ever understand Chinese or English, because, as the thought experiment suggests, being able to 'translate' Chinese into English does not entail 'understanding' either Chinese or English: all that the person in the thought experiment, and hence a computer, is able to do is to execute certain syntactic manipulations. Douglas Hofstadter and Daniel Dennett in their book The Mind's I criticize Searle's view of AI, particularly the Chinese room argument.

Stevan Harnad argues that Searle's "Strong AI" is really just another name for functionalism and computationalism, and that these positions are the real targets of his critique. Functionalists argue that consciousness can be defined as a set of informational processes inside the brain. It follows that anything that carries out the same informational processes as a human is also conscious. Thus, if humans wrote a computer program that was conscious, they could run that computer program on, say, a system of ping-pong balls and beer cups and the system would be equally conscious, because it was running the same information processes.

Searle argues that this is impossible, since consciousness is a physical property, like digestion or fire. No matter how good a simulation of digestion is built on the computer, it will not digest anything; no matter how well it simulates fire, nothing will get burnt. By contrast, informational processes are observer-relative: observers pick out certain patterns in the world and consider them information processes, but information processes are not things-in-the-world themselves. Since they do not exist at a physical level, Searle argues, they cannot have causal efficacy and thus cannot cause consciousness. There is no physical law, Searle insists, that can see the equivalence between a personal computer, a series of ping-pong balls and beer cans, and a pipe-and-water system all implementing the same program.

Social reality
Searle extended his inquiries into observer-relative phenomena by trying to understand social reality. Searle begins by arguing collective intentionality (e.g., "we are going for a walk") is a distinct form of intentionality, not simply reducible to individual intentionality (e.g., "I am going for a walk with him and I think he thinks he is going for a walk with me and he thinks I think I am going for a walk with him and...")

In The Construction of Social Reality (1995), Searle addresses the mystery of how social constructs like "baseball" or "money" can exist in a world consisting only of physical particles in fields of force. Adapting an idea by Elizabeth Anscombe in "On Brute Facts", Searle distinguishes between brute facts, like the height of a mountain, and institutional facts, like the score of a baseball game. Aiming at an explanation of social phenomena in terms of Anscombe's notion, he argues that society can be explained in terms of institutional facts, and institutional facts arise out of collective intentionality through constitutive rules with the logical form "X counts as Y in C". Thus, for instance, filling out a ballot counts as a vote in a polling place, getting so many votes counts as a victory in an election, getting a victory counts as being elected president in the presidential race, etc.

Many sociologists, however, do not see Searle's contributions to social theory as very significant. Neil Gross, for example, argues that Searle's views on society are more or less a reconstitution of the sociologist Émile Durkheim's theories of social facts, social institutions, collective representations, and the like. Searle's ideas are thus open to the same criticisms as Durkheim's. Searle responded that Durkheim's work was worse than he had originally believed and, admitting he had not read much of Durkheim's work, said: "Because Durkheim's account seemed so impoverished I did not read any further in his work." Steven Lukes, however, responded to Searle's response to Gross and argued point by point against the allegations that Searle makes against Durkheim, essentially upholding Gross's argument that Searle's work bears a great resemblance to Durkheim's. Lukes attributes Searle's miscomprehension of Durkheim's work to the fact that Searle had never read Durkheim.

Searle–Lawson debate

In recent years, Searle's main interlocutor on issues of social ontology has been Tony Lawson. Although their accounts of social reality are similar, there are important differences. Lawson emphasizes the notion of social totality whereas Searle prefers to refer to institutional facts. Furthermore, Searle believes that emergence implies causal reduction whereas Lawson argues that social totalities cannot be completely explained by the causal powers of their components. Searle also places language at the foundation of the construction of social reality, while Lawson believes that community formation necessarily precedes the development of language and, therefore, there must be the possibility for non-linguistic social structure formation. The debate is ongoing and takes place additionally through regular meetings of the Centre for Social Ontology at the University of California, Berkeley and the Cambridge Social Ontology Group at the University of Cambridge.

Rationality
In Rationality in Action (2001), Searle argues that standard notions of rationality are badly flawed. According to what he calls the Classical Model, rationality is seen as something like a train track: a person moves onto it at one point with their beliefs and desires, and then the rules of rationality compel them all the way to a conclusion. Searle doubts that this picture of rationality holds generally.

Searle briefly critiques one particular set of these rules: those of mathematical decision theory. He points out that its axioms require that anyone who valued a quarter and their life would, at some odds, bet their life for a quarter. Searle insists he would never take such a bet and believes that this stance is perfectly rational.

Most of his attack is directed against the common conception of rationality, which he believes is badly flawed. First, he argues that reasons does not cause an individual to do anything, because having sufficient reason wills, but does not force, them to do that thing. Therefore, in any decision situation, people experience a gap between reasons and actions. For example, when a person decides to vote, they may determine that they care most about economic policy and that they prefer candidate Jones's economic policy, but they must also make an effort to actually cast a vote. Similarly, every time a smoker who feels guilty about their action lights a cigarette, they are aware that they are succumbing to their craving, and not merely acting automatically as they do when they exhale. This gap makes people think they have freedom of the will. Searle thinks that whether one really has free will or not is an open question, but considers its absence highly unappealing because it makes the feeling of freedom of will an epiphenomenon, which is highly unlikely from the evolutionary point of view given its biological cost. He also says, "All rational activity presupposes free will".

Second, Searle believes that people can rationally do things that do not result from their own desires. It is widely believed that one cannot derive an "ought" from an "is", i.e., that facts about how the world is can never tell a person what they should do (Hume's Law). By contrast, insofar as a fact is understood to relate to an institution (marriage, promises, commitments, etc.), which is to be understood as a system of constitutive rules, then what one should do can be understood as following from the institutional fact of what one has done; institutional fact, then, can be understood as opposed to the "brute facts" related to Hume's Law. For example, Searle believes that the promise of doing something means that one must do it, because by making the promise one participates in the constitutive rules that arrange the system of promise-making itself; a "shouldness" is implicit in the mere factual action of promising. Furthermore, he believes that this provides a desire-independent reason for an action – if one orders a drink at a bar, there is an obligation to pay for it even if one has no desire to do so. This argument, which he first made in his paper, "How to Derive 'Ought' from 'Is'" (1964), remains highly controversial, but Searle maintained that "the traditional metaphysical distinction between fact and value cannot be captured by the linguistic distinction between 'evaluative' and 'descriptive' because all such speech act notions are already normative".

Third, Searle argues that much of rational deliberation involves adjusting patterns of desires, which are often inconsistent, to decide between outcomes, not the other way around. While in the Classical Model one would start from viewing a desire to go to Paris as a greater factor than saving money, which would lead to calculating the cheapest way to get there, Searle would argue that people balance the desire of Paris against the desire to save money to determine which one they value more. Hence, he believes that rationality is not a system of rules, but more of an adverb. Certain behaviors are seen as rational, no matter what their source, and a system of rules derives from finding patterns in what is considered rational.

Searle–Derrida debate

Bibliography
 Speech Acts: An Essay in the Philosophy of Language (1969), Cambridge University Press, 
 The Campus War: A Sympathetic Look at the University in Agony (political commentary; 1971)
 Expression and Meaning: Studies in the Theory of Speech Acts (essay collection; 1979)
 Intentionality: An Essay in the Philosophy of Mind (1983)
 
 Minds, Brains and Science: The 1984 Reith Lectures (lecture collection; 1984)
 Foundations of Illocutionary Logic (John Searle & Daniel Vanderveken 1985)
 The Rediscovery of the Mind (1992)
 The Construction of Social Reality (1995)
 The Mystery of Consciousness (review collection; 1997)
 Mind, Language and Society: Philosophy in the Real World (summary of earlier work; 1998)
 Rationality in Action (2001)
 Consciousness and Language (essay collection; 2002)
 Freedom and Neurobiology (lecture collection; 2004)
 Mind: A Brief Introduction (summary of work in philosophy of mind; 2004)
 Philosophy in a New Century: Selected Essays (2008)
 Making the Social World: The Structure of Human Civilization (2010)
 "What Your Computer Can't Know" (review of Luciano Floridi, The Fourth Revolution: How the Infosphere Is Reshaping Human Reality, Oxford University Press, 2014; and Nick Bostrom, Superintelligence: Paths, Dangers, Strategies, Oxford University Press, 2014), The New York Review of Books, vol. LXI, no. 15 (October 9, 2014), pp. 52–55.
 Seeing Things As They Are: A Theory of Perception (2015)

See also

References

Sources
 John Searle and His Critics (Ernest Lepore and Robert Van Gulick, eds.; 1991)
 John Searle (Barry Smith, ed.; 2003)
 John Searle and the Construction of Social Reality (Joshua Rust; 2006)
 Intentional Acts and Institutional Facts (Savas Tsohatzidis, ed.; 2007)
 Searle's Philosophy and Chinese Philosophy: Constructive Engagement (Bo Mou, ed.; 2008)
 John Searle (Joshua Rust; 2009)

Further reading
 The issue of free will in John R. Searle: a contrast of biological naturalism to physicalism and to functionalism – Cescon, E., & Nunes, D. P. (2015). A questão do livre-arbítrio em John R. Searle: uma contraposição do naturalismo biológico ao fisicalismo e ao funcionalismo. Cognitio-Estudos: revista eletrônica de filosofia, 12(2), 179–190.
 Papers on the History of Speech Act Theory by Barry Smith
 "Minds, Brains and Programs", The Behavioral and Brain Sciences.3, pp.417–424. (1980)
 "Is the Brain a Digital Computer?" (1990) Presidential Address to the American Philosophical Association
 "Collective Intentions and Actions" (1990) in Intentions in Communication J.M.P.R. Cohen, & M. and E. Pollack. Cambridge, Mass.: . MIT Press: pp. 401–416.
 The Problem of Consciousness, Social Research, Vol. 60, No.1, Spring 1993.
 Consciousness Annu. Rev. Neurosci. (2000) 23:557–78. Review.
 D. Koepsell (ed.) and L. Moss (ed.) "Searle and Smith: A Dialogue" in John Searle's Ideas About Social Reality: Extensions, Criticisms, and Reconstructions (2003), Blackwell, 
 Dualism revisited J Physiol Paris. 2007 Jul–Nov;101(4–6):169–78. Epub 2008 Jan 19.
 M. Bennett, D. Dennett, P. Hacker, J. Searle, Neuroscience and Philosophy: Brain, Mind and Language (2007), Columbia University Press, 
 The Storm Over the University
 Interview with Léo Peruzzo Júnior.
 Doerge (2006), Friedrich Christoph: Illocutionary Acts—Austin's Account and What Searle Made Out of It. Tuebingen: Tuebingen University.
 Koblizek (2012), Tomas: How to Make the Concepts Clear: Searle's Discussion with Derrida. Organon F, Suppl. Issue 2, pp.157–165. (Searle's reply to Koblizek: ibid., pp.217–220.).
 Gary Marcus, "Am I Human?: Researchers need new ways to distinguish artificial intelligence from the natural kind", Scientific American, vol. 316, no. 3 (March 2017), pp.58–63. Multiple tests of artificial-intelligence efficacy are needed because, "just as there is no single test of athletic prowess, there cannot be one ultimate test of intelligence." One such test, a "Construction Challenge", would test perception and physical action -—"two important elements of intelligent behavior that were entirely absent from the original Turing test." Another proposal has been to give machines the same standardized tests of science and other disciplines that schoolchildren take. A so far insuperable stumbling block to artificial intelligence is an incapacity for reliable disambiguation. "[V]irtually every sentence [that people generate] is ambiguous, often in multiple ways." A prominent example is known as the "pronoun disambiguation problem": a machine has no way of determining to whom or what a pronoun in a sentence—such as "he", "she" or "it"—refers.

External links

 
 John Searle on mind, matter, consciousness and his theory of perception
 Conversations with Searle
 Interview in Conversations with History series. Available in webcast and podcast.
 Video or transcript of an interview with John Searle on language, writing, mind, and consciousness
 Video: Searle on the Free Speech Movement at UC Berkeley (1982)
 Video: "Our shared condition—consciousness", Searle's May 2013 TED talk
 Webcast of Philosophy of Society lectures
 The Moscow Center for Consciousness Studies video interview with John Searle 2011-06-13
 1984 audio
 Figure/Ground interview with John Searle. November 19th, 2012.

1932 births
20th-century American philosophers
21st-century American philosophers
Alumni of Christ Church, Oxford
American Rhodes Scholars
Analytic philosophers
Artificial intelligence researchers
Communication theorists
American consciousness researchers and theorists
Epistemologists
Fellows of the American Academy of Arts and Sciences
Jean Nicod Prize laureates
Living people
Members of the European Academy of Sciences and Arts
Metaphysicians
National Humanities Medal recipients
Ontologists
Ordinary language philosophy
Philosophers of culture
Philosophers of language
Philosophers of mathematics
Philosophers of mind
Philosophers of science
Philosophers of social science
Philosophers of technology
Social philosophers
University of California, Berkeley faculty
University of Wisconsin–Madison alumni
Writers from Denver
20th-century American male writers
21st-century American male writers